The 2012 European Juniors Wrestling Championships was held in Zagreb, Croatia between June 19–24, 2012.

Medal table

Team ranking

Medal summary

Men's freestyle

Men's Greco-Roman

Women's freestyle

References

External links
Official website

Wrestling
European Wrestling Juniors Championships
Sports competitions in Zagreb